A record shop or record store is a retail outlet that sells recorded music. In the late 19th century and the early 20th century, record shops only sold gramophone records, but over the 20th century, record shops sold the new formats that were developed, such as eight track tapes, compact cassettes and compact discs (CDs). Today in the 21st century, record stores sell CDs, vinyl records and in some cases, DVDs of movies, TV shows, cartoons and concerts. Some record stores also sell music-related items such as posters of bands or singers, -related clothing items and even merchandise such as bags and coffee mugs.

Even when CDs became popular during the 1990s, people in English-speaking countries still used the term "record shop" to describe a shop selling sound recordings such as CDs. With the vinyl revival of the 21st century, often generating more income than CDs, the name is again accurate.

Modern era

United Kingdom
Prior to the 2000s, more record shops were privately run, independent businesses, meaning that prices could differ from town to town and store to store. In the 2000s, record shops are largely chain-owned and thus prices are fairly similar in different towns. In the United Kingdom the national chain style of selling records and tapes developed with Our Price, itself originally a small independent business founded in the early 1970s that expanded nationwide.

The current record store chains in the UK are HMV, Fopp, and Rough Trade.  The enormous increase in sales of vinyl records in the 2000s has provided an opportunity for growth in some sectors.  According to a recent study, Brighton, England has the highest number of record stores per 100,000 residents in the world.

United States
With the demise of chains such as Sam Goody (except for 2 stores) and Tower Records in the 2000s, there remained no national retail chains focused on sales of recorded music except for FYE. Although music sales continued in dedicated sections of video stores (until their demise) and at big box retailers such as Best Buy, Walmart and Target. Most record retailers today are independent retailers.

History
Spillers Records in Cardiff, Wales, founded in 1894 by Henry Spiller, is reputed to be the oldest record shop in the world. It originally specialised in the sale of phonographs, cylinders and shellac discs.

Shellac and then vinyl records were popular right up to the 1990s when CDs became the most popular form of recorded music. Soon, however, mail order and internet selling caused prices to fall, and with the advent of downloads and streaming, many record shops were forced to close. The vinyl revival has however increased income for record shops, and many new record shops and even chains of record shops have opened.

Major chains in the UK and North America that have closed in recent years are Our Price, Zavvi, The Wherehouse, Andys Records, Music and Video Club and Media Play. HMV have closed all stores in North America and Ireland, although still present in the UK. Virgin Megastores have closed all stores in North America and Europe.  Tower Records has closed all stores in North America except for one store in Mexico . Rough Trade is, however, currently expanding, with two shops in London, one in Cambridge, one Megastore in New York and plans to further expand.

Current record shop chains in Europe are now HMV (UK), Tower Records (Ireland), Free Record shop (Luxembourg: complete stores, Netherlands: shop-in shop), Velvet Music, Plato, (both Netherlands) and Golden Discs (Ireland). Record shop chains still present in North America include Sunrise Records (Canada), its subsidiary FYE (For Your Entertainment), which in turn owns the last 2 Sam Goody stores. Outside of Europe and North America, the current record store chains include Virgin Megastores, HMV and Tower Records.

The HMV Vault in Birmingham, England is now the world's largest record shop, opening its doors in October 2019. Before this, the former HMV in Oxford Street, London, England claimed to be the world's largest record store. The shop was originally opened in 1921 by the composer Sir Edward Elgar and had four floors of CDs, LPs, singles and DVDs. During the ‘60s, the in-store recording studio was used by Brian Epstein to record the Beatles' first demo. The revamped store was reopened in 2013 attended by many of the world's biggest stars including Paul McCartney, Robbie Williams and Elton John. The largest record shop in Ireland is Tower Records in Dublin, the largest in Asia is Tower Records in Shibuya, Tokyo and the largest in the USA is Amoeba Records in Los Angeles. The largest record shop in the Nordic countries is Bengans in Goteborg, Sweden, which opened in 1974.

In some countries, electronics stores and department store chains have very large, comprehensive CD departments which now also sell vinyl records. These include Saturn, Media Markt and Fnac (Europe) and El Corte Inglés (Spain). Saturn in Cologne, Germany claims to now have the world's largest selection of records. The world's largest store selling records, CDs and other related and non-related products is Saturn in Hamburg, Germany. This former department store is the world's largest electronic retailer with 6 floors selling consumer products related to music and electric appliances including record players.

Record stores played a vital role in African American communities for many decades. In the 1960s and 1970s, between 500 and 1,000 black-owned record stores operated in the American South, and probably twice as many in the United States as a whole. African American entrepreneurs embraced record stores as key vehicles for economic empowerment and critical public spaces for black consumers at a time that many black-owned businesses were closing amid desegregation.

Used market
In addition to shops that sell new products, many record shops specialize in second hand, vintage or used collectible records, which they purchase from the public or other dealers, and sell for a profit. Some used record stores also sell used CDs and DVD movies. It is not uncommon for such shops to contain several items priced in the hundreds or thousands of US dollars (or local equivalent) due to their rarity, as well as items that are fairly common for much less. This type of record shop has also faced fierce competition from Internet sites like eBay and Discogs, where people can sell their own records and avoid "the middle man". Some pawnshops sell used CDs.

Independent stores
Many customers prefer to buy vinyl from small, independent record stores with a larger selection than department stores. In many countries including the UK and the U.S., the specialty record store business is booming with hundreds opening from 2013 to 2016.  The County of Los Angeles currently has more independent record stores than any other county in the U.S. with over 50 stores ranging from Amoeba Records in Hollywood (which bills itself as the "world's largest independent record store") to The Record Parlour, where patrons can purchase, produce and perform music.

In the United Kingdom, London has Flashback Records (a small chain), Honest Jon's in Portobello Market London amongst others. There is also the aforementioned Spillers Records in Cardiff, and Brighton has Resident Records.

See also
 Online music store
 Record Store Day

References

Further reading

Garth Cartwright, Going for a song: a chronicle of the UK record shop, Flood gallery publishing, 2018
Joshua Clark Davis, "For the Records: How African American Consumers and Music Retailers Created Commercial Public Space in the 1960s and 1970s South," Southern Cultures, Winter 2011